Thangpal Dhap is a village in Sindhupalchok District in the Bagmati Zone of central Nepal. At the time of the 1991 Nepal census, it had a population of 2994 and had 581 houses in the village.

References

Populated places in Sindhupalchowk District